The Rocky Knob AVA is an American Viticultural Area in a mountainous area east of the Blue Ridge Parkway in southwest Virginia. The AVA includes portions of Floyd and Patrick counties.  The area is located on the eastern slopes of the Blue Ridge Mountains near the towns of Woolwine and Meadows of Dan and astride the Blue Ridge Parkway.  It was established in 1983 and encompasses .  The soil is primarily loam and gravel and is well-drained.  Rocky Knob AVA was named for the eponymously named mountainous recreational area located within the AVA.

Climate 
Strong winds at these elevations help protect grapes from fungus and mildew conditions. The vineyards are located in hardiness zones 6b and 7a.

References 

American Viticultural Areas
Geography of Floyd County, Virginia
Geography of Patrick County, Virginia
Virginia wine
1983 establishments in Virginia